The following is a list of ambassadors of the Czech Republic to Russia.

 1993–1996 Rudolf Slánský Jr.
 1996–2000 Luboš Dobrovský
 2000–2005 Jaroslav Bašta
 2005–2009 Miroslav Kostelka
 2010–2012 Petr Kolář
 2014–2018 Vladimír Remek
 2018–present Vítězslav Pivoňka

See also
Czech Republic–Russia relations

 
Czech Republic
Russia